Melicope stonei is an endemic tree species discovered from Kaua‘i, Hawaiian Islands. It is a Critically Endangered (CR) single island endemic species.

Description
Melicope stonei is a tree (3–)5–12 m tall, trunks up to 25 cm diameter, bark smooth, mottled gray to light brown, new growth and young branchlets tomentose, yellow-tan, glabrate in age.  Leaves are opposite, unifoliolate, coriaceous, and elliptic. Inflorescences in axillary and ramiflorous, fasciculate cymes to 22 mm long. Flowers are male or female, plants monoecious, 3–5 (–7), sepals deltoid-ovate. Capsules medium to dark green when fresh, irregularly pusticulate, 5–9 × 15–21 mm, of 4 distinct follicles, slightly ascending, occasionally 1 or more abortive, exocarp glabrous, glandular punctate, endocarp glabrous. Seeds are 1–2 per carpel, ovoid, 6–8 mm long. Melicope stonei has been observed with flower buds in January, may, and September, and with both flower and fruit during January, February, and July.

Etymology
Melicope stonei is named in honor of Benjamin Clemens Masterman Stone, British-American botanist, born in Shanghai, China (1933-1994). While working at the Philippine National Museum on the Flora of the Philippines Project. Earliest known collections of Melicope stonei were made by David Lorence and Timothy Flynn (National Tropical Botanical Garden) as far back as February 1988 within the forests of Mākaha Valley, Kaua‘i.

References

External links
 

Endemic flora of Hawaii
stonei